is a Japanese comedy film released in 2007. Hitoshi Ueki made his final film appearance in the film.

Plot
Kimihiko Onizuka (Sadao Abe) is a salaryman infatuated with maiko (apprentice geisha) and whose greatest goal in life is to play a party game called yakyuken with one. Upon being transferred to his company's Kyoto branch, he dumps his coworker girlfriend Fujiko (Kou Shibasaki) and makes his first ever visit to a geisha house. However, when the realization of Kimihiko's lifelong dream is rudely interrupted by a professional baseball star named Kiichiro Naito (Shinichi Tsutsumi), he vows revenge by becoming a pro baseball player himself. Meanwhile, Fujiko decides to become an apprentice geisha. A rivalry between Kimihiko and Naito ensues in which they try to out-do each other at baseball, K-1, cooking, acting and even politics.

Cast

 Sadao Abe as Kimihiko Onizuka
 Shinichi Tsutsumi as Kiichiro Naito
 Kou Shibasaki as Fujiko Osawa
 Kotomi Kyono as Koume
 Hitoshi Ueki as Saito

References

External links
  
 

2007 films
2000s Japanese-language films
Japanese comedy films
Nippon TV films
New People films
Toho films
Films with screenplays by Kankurō Kudō
Films scored by Taro Iwashiro
2000s Japanese films